The National Football Conference (NFC) is one of two conferences within the National Football League (NFL), the American Football Conference (AFC) being the other.  Prior to 1970, there were two separate professional football leagues, the National Football League and the American Football League (AFL).  In 1970, the AFL merged with the NFL.  As part of the merger, the former AFL teams, plus three former NFL teams (the Baltimore Colts, the Cleveland Browns and the Pittsburgh Steelers), were placed into the AFC.  The remaining former NFL teams were placed in the NFC. As of the 2020 season only the Detroit Lions have not won an NFC championship.

Background
The NFC champion is not necessarily the team with the best record in the regular season.  Rather, the champion is decided by the NFC Championship Game as part of the post-season playoffs involving the teams with the best regular season records.  The Dallas Cowboys won the first two NFC championships, in 1970 and 1971.  No team has won more than two consecutive NFC championships.  The Cowboys won two consecutive NFC championships three times (1970–1971, 1977–1978, 1992–1993).  The Minnesota Vikings (1973–1974), Washington Redskins (1982–1983), San Francisco 49ers (1988–1989), Green Bay Packers (1996–1997), and Seattle Seahawks (2013–2014) have also won two consecutive NFC championships.

Through the 2020 season, the Dallas Cowboys have won more NFC championships than any other team, with eight.  The San Francisco 49ers have won seven. The Washington Redskins and New York Giants have each won five NFC championships.  The  Los Angeles/St. Louis Rams has won four and the Minnesota Vikings and Green Bay Packers have won three apiece.  The San Francisco 49ers have also been the NFC runner up, as a result of losing the NFC Championship Game, a record nine times.  The Rams, Cowboys and Packers have each been the runner up six times.

The record for the most regular season wins by an NFC champion is 15, by the 1984 San Francisco 49ers, the 1985 Chicago Bears and the 2015 Carolina Panthers, each with a 15–1 record.  Six NFC champions have won 14 games.  The 1982 Washington Redskins had the fewest wins of any NFC champion, with eight wins and just one loss in the strike–shortened 1982 season.  The fewest wins by an NFC champion in a complete season were by the 1979 Los Angeles Rams, 2008 Arizona Cardinals, and the 2011 New York Giants. All three had nine wins and seven losses.

Tom Landry was the head coach for five NFC championships, more than any other head coach.  Landry coached the Dallas Cowboys to NFC championships in 1970, 1971, 1975, 1977 and 1978.  Joe Gibbs coached four NFC champions, and Bud Grant, Bill Walsh and Mike Holmgren each coached three.  Holmgren and Dick Vermeil both won NFC championships for two different franchises.  Holmgren was the head coach of the 1996 and 1997 NFC champion Green Bay Packers and of the 2005 NFC champion Seattle Seahawks.  Vermeil was the head coach of the 1980 NFC champion Philadelphia Eagles, and 19 years later was the head coach of the 1999 NFC champion St. Louis Rams.

Roger Staubach and Joe Montana were each the starting quarterback for four NFC championships, more than any other quarterback.  Staubach was the starting quarterback for the 1971, 1975, 1977 and 1978 Dallas Cowboys.  Montana was the starting quarterback for the 1981, 1984, 1988 and 1989 San Francisco 49ers.  Fran Tarkenton, Troy Aikman and Kurt Warner were each the starting quarterback for three NFC champions.  Warner accomplished this for two different franchises, the 1999 and 2001 St. Louis Rams and the 2008 Arizona Cardinals.  Joe Theismann, Phil Simms, Brett Favre, Eli Manning and Russell Wilson were each the starting quarterback for two NFC champions, although Simms missed the NFC Championship Game in one of those seasons (1990) due to injury.

Chuck Foreman and Emmitt Smith were each the leader in rushing yards for an NFC champion three times.  Others who led an NFC champion in rushing yards multiple times are Duane Thomas, Tony Dorsett, John Riggins, Wendell Tyler, Roger Craig, Marshall Faulk and Marshawn Lynch.  Tyler did so with two different franchises, the 1979 Los Angeles Rams and the 1984 San Francisco 49ers.  Jerry Rice and Michael Irvin each led an NFC champion in receiving yards three times.  Bob Hayes, Drew Pearson, Charlie Brown, Dwight Clark, Gary Clark and Antonio Freeman each led an NFC champion in receiving yards twice.

The 1983 Washington Redskins had seven 1st team All-Pros, more than any other NFC champion.  The 2012 San Francisco 49ers and 2015 Carolina Panthers each had six and 1985 Chicago Bears had five.  The 1975 Dallas Cowboys, 2000 New York Giants and 2007 New York Giants did not have any 1st team All-Pros.  Ron Yary of the 1973, 1974 and 1976 Minnesota Vikings is the only offensive lineman with three 1st team All-Pro selections for an NFC champion.  Several defensive players have been 1st team All-Pros for two NFC champions, including Alan Page, Cliff Harris, Ronnie Lott, LeRoy Butler, Richard Sherman and Earl Thomas.

The Super Bowl is played annually between the AFC champion and the NFC champion.  The first four Super Bowls were played prior to the AFL/NFL merger between the AFL and NFL champion.  The 1970 NFC champion Dallas Cowboys lost the first Super Bowl played after the merger, but the 1971 Cowboys were the first NFC team to win the Super Bowl.  The NFC had a streak in which its champion won 13 consecutive Super Bowls, from the 1984 NFC champion San Francisco 49ers through the 1996 NFC champion Green Bay Packers.  Overall, the NFC champion has won 26 of the 52 Super Bowls played since the formation of the NFC with the AFL/NFL merger through the end of the 2019 season.

Key

NFC Championship Teams

Footnotes 
Pat Haden was the Los Angeles Rams' starting quarterback for most of the 1979 season.  After he broke a finger late in the season Vince Ferragamo replaced him at quarterback for the last three regular season games, and was also the quarterback for the NFC Championship game and Super Bowl XIV.
Jay Schroeder was the Washington Redskins starting quarterback for most of the 1987 season.  But Doug Williams replaced him several times during the season and was the Redskins quarterback for the NFC Championship game and Super Bowl XXII.
Phil Simms was the starting quarterback for the 1990 New York Giants until suffering a leg injury late in the season.  As a result, Jeff Hostetler was the Giants starting quarterback for the last two regular season games and for the postseason, including the NFC Championship game and Super Bowl XXV.
Colin Kaepernick and Alex Smith both finished the 2012 season with 218 attempts. Smith started the first nine games of the season before suffering a concussion. Kaepernick took over as starter the following week and remained the starter when Smith was cleared to play the week after that. Kaepernick was the 49ers starting quarterback for the final seven regular season games and the postseason, including the NFC Championship Game. He also started in Super Bowl XLVII.
Carson Wentz was the starting quarterback for the 2017 Philadelphia Eagles until suffering an injury late in the season.  As a result, Nick Foles was the Eagles' starting quarterback for the last three regular season games and for the postseason, including the NFC Championship game.  He also started Super Bowl LII.
Kyle Shanahan and his father Mike Shanahan are the first father-son head coaches to make appearances in the Super Bowl.

References
General

Specific

 
National Football League lists
Super Bowl lists
National Football League records and achievements